The  is an indoor sporting arena located in Tomakomai, Hokkaidō, Japan. The arena opened in 1996. It has a capacity of 4,015 (3,015 seated and 1,000 standing). It is the home arena of the Oji Eagles ice hockey team.

Many tournaments such as the Asia League Ice Hockey and national high school competitions are held here.

History 
The arena cost about 5.1 billion yen and was completed in 1996, the 30th anniversary of the Tomakomai City's declaration as a "Sports City".

At the opening ceremony, members of the Tomakomai Figure Skating Club and local sports clubs cut the ribbon, and there was a performance by Midori Ito. The Oji Paper Ice Hockey Team played a game with a Russian team.

It has been designated as a national training center for ice hockey since 2008.

In April 2015, the holding company of Oji Paper Prince Holdings changed the name of the arena to "Swan Prince Ice Arena".

Notes
Since April 2015, this arena is called "Hakucho Oji Ice Arena" by the introduction of naming rights.

References

References

 City of Tomakomai Hakucho Arena 

Indoor ice hockey venues in Japan
Indoor arenas in Japan
Sports venues completed in 1996
Sports venues in Hokkaido
1996 establishments in Japan
Tomakomai, Hokkaido